Warner A. Graham (January 9, 1884 – January 28, 1934) was a Vermont attorney and judge.  He was notable for his service as a judge of the Vermont Superior Court and an associate justice of the Vermont Supreme Court.

Early life
Warner Aiken Graham was born in Greensboro, Vermont on January 9, 1884, the son of William and Inez Lorinda (Fayer) Graham.  He attended the schools of Greensboro, and graduated from Hardwick Academy in 1903.  In 1907, Graham received his LL.B. degree from Albany Law School and attained admission to the bar.

Start of career
Graham settled in Rockingham, where he began to practice law in partnership with Herbert D. Ryder.  A Republican, Graham served in local offices, including auditor for the village of Bellows Falls, and grand juror (municipal court prosecutor) for the town of Rockingham.  During the governorship of Allen M. Fletcher, Graham served as his Secretary of Civil and Military Affairs (chief assistant).  In 1914, Graham was elected to the Vermont House of Representatives, and he served one term.

Judicial career
From 1916 to 1923, Graham was probate judge for the district that included Rockingham.  While serving on the probate court, his most notable matter was adjudicating the estate of Hetty Green.

In 1923, Graham was appointed a judge of the Vermont Superior Court.  He advanced through seniority to become the court's chief judge in 1929, and he served until 1931.  He was succeeded on the superior court by Deane C. Davis.

In 1931, Graham was appointed as an associate justice of the Vermont Supreme Court, filling the vacancy caused by the resignation of Julius A. Willcox, and he served until his death.

Death and burial
Graham died at the hospital in Rockingham on January 28, 1934.  He had been ill with appendicitis, and died as the result of post-surgical complications including gangrene and peritonitis.  He was buried at Oak Hill Cemetery in Bellows Falls.

Family
In 1915, Graham married Blanche S. Woodfall (1885-1969) of Bellows Falls.  They were the parents of a son, Gordon (1921-1943).  Gordon Graham died while serving in the United States Army during World War II, perishing as a result of the sinking of the SS Dorchester.

References

Sources

Newspapers

Books

Internet

1884 births
1934 deaths
People from Orleans County, Vermont
People from Bellows Falls, Vermont
Albany Law School alumni
Vermont lawyers
Republican Party members of the Vermont House of Representatives
Justices of the Vermont Supreme Court
Burials in Vermont
20th-century American politicians
20th-century American judges
20th-century American lawyers